Alagie Modou Jobe (born 27 October 1988) is a Gambian professional footballer who plays as a goalkeeper for National First Division club Black Leopards and the Gambia national team.

Club career
Born in Sanyang, Jobe has played club football for Real de Banjul, Niarry Tally, Linguère and El-Kanemi Warriors. He re-joined Linguère in October 2017 for pre-season training, before signing for Nigerian club El-Kanemi Warriors in November 2017. He made his debut for the club in the Nigerian Professional Football League in March 2018. In 2019, Jobe signed for Saudi club Jeddah. In 2021, he joined South African club Black Leopards.

International career
Jobe made his international debut for Gambia in 2007.

References

1988 births
Living people
Gambian footballers
The Gambia international footballers
Real de Banjul FC players
ASC Niarry Tally players
ASC Linguère players
El-Kanemi Warriors F.C. players
Jeddah Club players
Black Leopards F.C. players
Nigeria Professional Football League players
Saudi First Division League players
National First Division players
Association football goalkeepers
2021 Africa Cup of Nations players
Gambian expatriate footballers
Gambian expatriate sportspeople in Senegal
Gambian expatriate sportspeople in Nigeria
Gambian expatriate sportspeople in South Africa
Expatriate footballers in Senegal
Expatriate footballers in Nigeria
Expatriate footballers in Saudi Arabia
Expatriate soccer players in South Africa